Brookner is a surname. Notable people with the surname include:

Aaron Brookner (born 1981), American film director and screenwriter
Anita Brookner (1928–2016), British writer and art historian
Howard Brookner (1954–1989), American film director
Jackie Brookner (1945–2015), American artist
Janine Brookner (1940-2021), American lawyer and Central Intelligence Agency officer